Kazakhstan sent a delegation to compete at the 2010 Winter Paralympics, in Vancouver, British Columbia, Canada. It fielded a single athlete in cross-country skiing.

Cross-country skiing 

The following athlete will be Kazakhstan's sole representative in cross-country skiing:

See also
Kazakhstan at the 2010 Winter Olympics
Kazakhstan at the Paralympics

References

External links
Vancouver 2010 Paralympic Games official website
International Paralympic Committee official website

Nations at the 2010 Winter Paralympics
2010
Paralympics